Raduczyce  is a village in the administrative district of Gmina Osjaków, within Wieluń County, Łódź Voivodeship, in central Poland.

The village has a population of 250.

References

Raduczyce